Anna Nilsson Simkovics (born 29 November 1993) is an Austrian orienteering competitor. At the World Games in 2013 she won a bronze medal in the mixed relay, together with Gernot Kerschbaumer, Robert Merl and Ursula Kadan.

References

External links
 

1993 births
Living people
Austrian orienteers
Female orienteers
World Games bronze medalists
Competitors at the 2013 World Games
World Games medalists in orienteering